Mere Huzoor is a Pakistani television drama series aired on Express Entertainment for the 2012 television season. It is produced by Asif Raza Mir and Babar Javed under the banner of A&B Entertainment, written by Rukhsana Nigar, directed by Nadeem Siddiqui, and features Shahood Alvi, Jana Malik, Nadia Afgan, Azra Aftab, and debutante Mawra Hocane. At the 12th Lux Style Awards, the series received a best television actor nomination due to Alvi's performance.

Cast 

 Shahood Alvi as Sultan Bakht
 Jana Malik as Nain Tara
 Nadia Afgan as Saleha
 Mawra Hocane as Amna
 Azra Aftab as Hajra
 Humaira Ali as Nain Tara's mother
 Khalid Butt
 Shamim Hilaly as Saeeda
 Saniya Shamshad as Rabia
 Rashid Mehmood as Sufi Abdul Rehman
 Faris Shafi as Abdul Mateen
 Uzma Hassan
 Ash Khan
 Raheela Agha as Chanda's mother
 Jibran Shahid as Muaaz

Lux Style Awards
Shahood Alvi's Best TV Actor (Satellite) nomination still remains the only nomination that Express Entertainment has ever received.

References 

2012 Pakistani television series debuts
2012 Pakistani television series endings